Estonian Malacological Society (Eesti Malakoloogia Ühing) is an Estonia-based society concerned with the study of molluscs. It was founded in 1996. It is a branch of the Estonian Naturalists' Society. The organization participated in Operation MegaLab, a Europe-wide survey of land snails, in 2009. It also has issued press releases to warn Estonians about the arrival in the country of invasive snail species that are garden pests.

See also
Malacological Society of London

References

Malacological societies
Scientific organizations established in 1996
Biology organizations
Science and technology in Estonia
Scientific organizations based in Estonia
1996 establishments in Estonia